K. N. Nehru (born November 9, 1952) is an Indian Tamil politician and Minister for Municipal Administration, Urban and Water Supply. He is the Member of Legislative Assembly (MLA) of the Tiruchirappalli West constituency. He is a former Minister for Transport  in the Government of Tamil Nadu. He has been elected to the Tamil Nadu Legislative Assembly on five occasions as a candidate of the Dravida Munnetra Kazhagam (DMK) party.
He is presently elevated as Principal Secretary of DMK.

Personal life 
K. N. Nehru was born in Neikulam on November 9, 1952. He completed his school education and now lives in Trichy.

Politics 
Nehru has been elected to the Tamil Nadu Legislative Assembly on four occasions, twice from Lalgudi constituency, in the elections of 1989 and 1996 and twice from 2006 and 2016 Tiruchirappalli West constituency.

Minister for Transport 
Nehru was the Minister for Transport in the DMK government from 2006 to 2011. During this period, the bus fleet was modernised and improvements were made to the frequency of buses, passenger amenities and connections to the new suburban areas of Chennai. More than 10,000 new buses were introduced across the state. Fuel efficiency was given an important thrust and drivers were educated on importance of managing fuel.

Charges 
Cases have been filed on Nehru by the All India Anna Dravida Munnetra Kazhagam government but the courts have dismissed them as being vague.

The Madras High Court struck down the controversial land-grabbing cells which were primarily used to torment common people and opposition figures. The court had clearly remarked chance of misuse by officials and ruling government citing broad language used in the act.

Elections Contested and Results

References 

Dravida Munnetra Kazhagam politicians
State cabinet ministers of Tamil Nadu
Living people
1952 births
People from Tiruchirappalli district
Tamil Nadu MLAs 1996–2001
Tamil Nadu MLAs 2006–2011
Tamil Nadu MLAs 2016–2021
Tamil Nadu MLAs 2021–2026